Carlos Gustavo Rosado Muñoz (1941–2013) was a notable Mexican businessman, mathematician and scholar.

He was born on October 19, 1941, in Mexico City and died on May 5, 2013, at his weekend home in Mineral del Chico, Hidalgo.

He was the son of General Álvaro Rosado Osorio, a hero of the Mexican Revolution and highly decorated army officer, and the aristocratic Adriana Muñoz Turnbull. He was the 4th child in a family of 8 children; five brothers and two sisters. He had a son, Carlos Octavio Rosado and a grandson, Carlos Francisco Rosado.

At the time of his death he was married to Patricia Ellen Van Nest and they lived in Mineral del Chico, Hidalgo, Mexico.

Professional

CRM was the 16th person to receive a degree in actuarial sciences from the Universidad Nacional Autónoma de México (UNAM) and graduated magna cum laude in 1965.  The title of his thesis being: “Modelos matemático actuariales aplicados en la valuación de planes privados de pensiones" (Actuarial mathematical models, applied in the valuation of private pension plans).

After graduation he became the founding professor of Pensions, as well as a professor of both, Actuarial Science and Mathematical Finance, at UNAM.  In 1975 he earned an MBA in risk management from Universidad de las Américas, at which he also later taught classes. In addition to UNAM and Universidad de las Americas, he was the dean of actuarial sciences at Universidad Anahuac. After retiring he continued to teach courses at Universidad Autónoma del Estado de Hidalgo.  CRM continued his studies, throughout his life, completing a doctorate in Philosophy with a major in Finance in 2004 and earned a doctorate in 2012 in Higher Education from Universidad Abierta de Tlaxcala.

CRM enjoyed a prominent career as an actuary in Mexico City, and was one of the original founders and designers of the Mexican Pension Plan system. In the mid 1980s he helped establish Ramos Rosado y Asociados  (RR y Asc), a commercial insurance broker and risk management firm (now AON), in Mexico City. At its peak, RR y Asc had in its portfolio some of the largest corporations in Mexico, including all of the major airlines that flew in and out of Mexico, as well as many other notable Fortune 500 companies such as Purina, BIC and GE. By 1990, RR y Asc employed over 300 people with offices in Mexico City, Monterrey, Guadalajara, Cancun and other major cities throughout Mexico.  He was instrumental in attracting to Mexico, Towers Watson, one of the largest actuarial firms in the world. In 2001, he established RYACSA, “Rosado y Asociados Consultores, Soluciones Actuariales, S.A. de C.V". which, after his death, continues to prosper.

He published several books in pension plan design, being the main advocate for the book: “Teoría y Práctica de los Planes Privados de Pensiones" (Theory & Practice of Private Pension Plans), as well as other works in mathematical theory and actuarial formulas.

CRM was a founding member of the Colegio Nacional de Actuarios, A.C., as well as serving as its President and a member of its advisory board. He was also a member of the American Actuarial Association and the American Academy of Actuaries (2001).
  
He was also active in the commercial sector, rising to the position of President of the Asociación Mexicana de Actuarios Consultores (AMAC), and of the Colegio Nacional de Actuarios (CONAC).  He was also a member of the Asociación Mexicana de Actuarios (AMA); the International Association of Consulting Actuaries (IACA) and the International Academy of Actuaries (IAA).

He was the first Mexican actuary to become a Fellow of the American Society of Pension Professionals & Actuaries (ASPPA) in 1974, and the first Mexican actuary to become a member of the American Academy of Actuaries (AAA).

He was included in Who's Who in the World, 11th edition, 1993-1994.

Due in large part to his efforts, the Secretaría de Educación Pública (Secretariat of Public Education (Mexico)) recognized the professional and academic efforts of specialists in contingent labor liabilities actuarial valuations (instead of:  “appraisals of contingency commercial liability”) granted by CONAC to those employed in that specialty.

He is considered by AMAC and CONAC as one of the main contributors in helping to develop the practice of pension plan consulting in Mexico, as well as contributing towards the development of many generations of actuaries, both academically and professionally.

Private life

In addition to his illustrious business and academic career, CRM enjoyed travel and had a passion for extreme sports. He raced cars as a young man and continued to race cars and motorcycles, well past retirement, as a Vintage Car Race Driver. He was an active member of the Federacion Mexicana de Automovilismo Deportivo, A.C.

In addition to cars, CRM loved riding road and off-road motorcycles, an activity he shared with his son Carlos Octavio. CRM also was a graduate of the illustrious Nürburgring BMW Motorcycle Road Racing School in Germany.

He loved the outdoors and, in particular, scuba diving. He was able to dive all over the world and was one of the first private individuals to be allowed to dive in the Galapagos Islands.

As a young man, he received equestrian training and, later in life, continued to ride horses with his wife in Llano Grande, Hidalgo.

He was an avid reader, an expert in Mexican “taco cuisine,” music, and Mexican art. Over his lifetime, he was able to sponsor and promote several notable Mexican artists, such as the late painter, Aurelio Pescina.

He loved animals, in particular, cats and dogs, of which he had many companions.  He donated his time generously as a member of the Board of Directors of the Escuela para Entrenamiento de Perros Guía para Ciegos I.A.P. and Conexión Animal de Servicio Institucional A.C. (México).

Generous by nature, CRM tutored high school and actuarial students and dedicated his time and hope to people with alcohol and drug addictions. A spiritual man, he believed that God gave him the serenity to follow His will throughout his life.

See also

 Álvaro Rosado Osorio (CRM's father) (in Wikipedia in Spanish)

References

People from Xalapa
1941 births
2013 deaths
National Autonomous University of Mexico alumni
Academic staff of Universidad Anáhuac México
Academic staff of Universidad Autónoma del Estado de Hidalgo